Masumi Okawa (born 13 November 1978) is a Japanese gymnast. She competed in five events at the 1996 Summer Olympics.

References

1978 births
Living people
Japanese female artistic gymnasts
Olympic gymnasts of Japan
Gymnasts at the 1996 Summer Olympics
Sportspeople from Shizuoka Prefecture
Asian Games medalists in gymnastics
Gymnasts at the 1994 Asian Games
Asian Games silver medalists for Japan
Medalists at the 1994 Asian Games
20th-century Japanese women